Bradford & Bingley plc was a British bank with headquarters in the West Yorkshire town of Bingley.

The bank was formed in December 2000 by demutualisation of the Bradford & Bingley Building Society following a vote of the building society's members, who swapped their nominal share of the building society for at least 250 shares of the newly formed bank.

In 2008, partly due to the credit crunch, the bank was nationalised and in effect split into two parts; the mortgage book and investment portfolios remained with the now publicly owned Bradford & Bingley plc, and the deposits and branch network (and a licence to use the B&B name for those aspects) was sold to Abbey National, itself owned by the Spanish Santander Group. The branch network was rebranded Santander on 11 January 2010 and the Bradford & Bingley name mainly relates to the nationalised section of the bank. From 2010, the brand has been used under licence for insurance products by BGL Group.

History

The Merger

The Bradford & Bingley Building Society was the product of a merger between the Bradford Equitable Building Society and the Bingley Building Society in 1964. There had been a move towards consolidation in the industry which had as many as 681 societies. In 1963 Bingley made the approach and the merger was effected with the understanding that there would be complete parity of control.  Although Bingley had the larger number of branches (29 v 23) it was smaller by assets (£43m v £56m). The Head Office was to be at Bingley; Bradford had the President and Bingley the Vice President; and there were Joint Managing Directors. The new Society ranked number eight in the industry.

Sustained Growth
The period between the merger and the conversion to a public company in 2000 saw sustained and substantial growth. Financial growth was aided by inflation, particularly in house prices, but the increase in members was from 164,000 in 1964 to 1.85m in 1988.  As well as organic development through the opening of new branches there were 24 acquisitions of other building societies between 1967 and 1987. The Hearts of Oak Society in 1982 was of particular benefit as it brought in 28 branches, mainly in the south-east. By 1988 the number of branches had increased from the 52 post-merger to around 250.  Despite all this, the Society was still only number eight in the industry – a reflection of the amalgamations that were taking place elsewhere.

In May 1997 the society bought Mortgage Express from Lloyds TSB for £64 million.

In December 2000 the society demutualised and floated on the London Stock Exchange (using the symbol BB) with former members of the society each receiving a minimum of 250 shares worth £567.50 at the time, and savers with more savings receiving more shares worth up to £5,000 each.

Subprime mortgage crisis

In order to combat the effects of the subprime mortgage crisis, in June 2008 the company launched a £400 million rights issue which was not well subscribed by shareholders, leaving much of issue with underwriters. The issue had not been helped when TPG Capital, who had previously agreed to take a 23% stake in the company, withdrew their support.

Due to the effects of the credit crunch, in September 2008 the company's share price dropped to a record low. On 25 September they announced that 370 jobs were to go. The bank had also been seeking options from the Financial Services Authority (FSA) and the government to secure the future of the company. Options included selling the company to another bank or nationalisation. With Bradford & Bingley being nationalised, the structure was already in place from the legislation involved in the nationalisation of the Northern Rock bank in February (see Banking (Special Provisions) Act 2008 and Nationalisation of Northern Rock). The European regulators approved the government's rescue plan for Bradford & Bingley after just 24 hours.

Part nationalisation and sale to Santander
There were reports from various sources that Bradford & Bingley was to be nationalised in its entirety, because a suitable buyer had not been found. On 29 September 2008, it was announced that the Spanish Santander Group would acquire all of Bradford & Bingley's £20 billion (2.7 million customers) savings business and branches. Santander paid £612 million, including the transfer of £208 million of capital relating to offshore companies. Bradford & Bingley's 197 retail branches, 141 agencies and related employees were transferred to Santander's subsidiary Abbey. The mortgage book, personal loan book, headquarters, treasury assets and its wholesale liabilities were taken into public ownership and closed to new business.

When the shares closed on 26 September they were worth 20 pence each, valuing the bank at £256 million, substantially less than Santander paid for it. In March 2006 the bank had been valued at £3.2 billion. In November 2008, the government set up a new company, UK Financial Investments (UKFI), to manage the shareholdings in Northern Rock and Bradford & Bingley.

Bradford & Bingley's shareholders were not reimbursed for their shares which the government had taken over. Over 300 shareholders complained to the UK Shareholders Association that they had not received information relating to the fate of their holdings. Peter Clokey of PricewaterhouseCoopers was appointed by the government in June 2009 to act as independent valuer of the business, and it was reported that shareholders would be told how much compensation they were entitled to by June 2010.

Clokey's assessment was published on 5 July 2010, finding that shareholders were not entitled to any compensation. The decision was appealed to the Upper Tribunal's Tax and Chancery Chamber where on 19 July 2012, Judge Sir Stephen Oliver recorded that the court was satisfied that the valuer had carried out his duties wholly in accordance with the compensation scheme.

In April 2009, the Financial Times reported that Bradford & Bingley may sell assets such as its commercial loan book, to assist in the running down its £42.2 billion loan book over the next ten years. In October, the Telegraph reported that the mortgage part of Bradford and Bingley would be mirroring the decision by Northern Rock to split their assets into good and bad assets, to attempt to pay off its £18.4 billion loan early.

On 11 January 2010, the combined business of Abbey and Bradford & Bingley was renamed Santander UK, and all branches were rebranded at a cost of £12 million. Alliance & Leicester was rebranded at the end of November 2010.

On 25 January 2010, the European Commission approved the state aid given to the bank. On 24 March 2010 UKFI announced the merger of the mortgage business with the bad bank of Northern Rock, Northern Rock (Asset Management) plc. The two businesses were merged under a single holding company, UK Asset Resolution, on 1 October 2010.

Transfer of ownership to Davidson Kempner
On 29 October, ownership of Bradford and Bingley was transferred from UK Asset Resolution to Davidson Kempner Capital Management, returning the company to private ownership.

Operations 
The group ran two distinct businesses: retail and lending.

Retail 
Bradford & Bingley distributed brand-name and third party financial products.  As at 31 December 2007 they had 197 branches and 140 third party agent locations offering retail products and face to face advice in addition to online and intermediary distribution.

Bradford & Bingley's approach to mortgage advising was innovative as they advised on and sold other providers mortgages as well as their own from 2000 to 2006.  In late 2006, as part of their aim to become the UK's leading specialist lender, Bradford & Bingley reverted to selling only their own mortgages under the Bradford & Bingley and Mortgage Express brands. In addition, Bradford & Bingley acquired mortgages from GMAC-RFC and Kensington Mortgage Group Ltd; this accounted for 44% of gross residential advances during 2007.

As mentioned above, the savings operations have been transferred to the Santander Group and have been rebranded under the Santander name.

Lending 
Bradford & Bingley had its own lending products including mortgage and commercial real estate products.  Bradford & Bingley International was an offshore subsidiary based on the Isle of Man, also since transferred to Santander through Abbey. Bradford & Bingley also provided loan quotes through Compare the Loan for those who did not have a Bradford & Bingley branch locally. Since the takeover by HM Treasury of the lending operations, Bradford & Bingley is no longer offering new mortgages or other lending products.

Bradford & Bingley had developed Mortgage Express into a 'niche' lending brand dealing with specialist lending with more complicated underwriting requirements such as buy-to-let and self-certification mortgages. Mortgage Express is also closed to new business, following the nationalisation.

Corporate affairs

Headquarters

Bradford & Bingley's former headquarters were on Main Street in Bingley. Offices in Crossflatts in Bingley were built in 2004. Following Santander's purchase of the savings business, it was confirmed in May 2009 that remaining Bradford & Bingley staff would transfer to the company's existing offices in Crossflatts, and that the building would be sold or sub-let.

Sainsbury's bought the building in 2010 and unveiled plans to redevelop it as a supermarket. Planning permission for a new supermarket was granted in September 2011, but in April 2012, Sainsbury's admitted that building work would not begin for another 12 months. In November 2013 the company revealed it would not go ahead with a new supermarket, but would instead demolish the building and sell the site. Demolition work was delayed by the discovery of roosting bats and asbestos, but began in January 2015. On 12 January 2017, it was confirmed that Sainsbury's had sold the site to rival supermarket company Lidl.

Trademarks 
During the nationalisation process, it was revealed that the bank had registered more than 100 separate trademarks featuring the bowler hat, its long-running logo. The bank had also purchased a bowler hat in 1995 which had formerly belonged to Stan Laurel, for £2,000.

Ownership of the trademarks transferred to Santander with the licence to use the Bradford & Bingley name as part of the sale.

Sponsorship 
Bradford & Bingley were previously sponsors of Yorkshire County Cricket Club, Bradford & Bingley RFC (formerly Bingley Bees), and team sponsor of Bradford City A.F.C. Valley Parade stadium had previously been known as Bradford & Bingley Stadium through sponsorship rights.

See also

Union for Bradford and Bingley Staff and Associated Companies

References

External links

British companies established in 1964
Banks established in 1964
Bank failures
Banks of the United Kingdom
Companies based in the City of Bradford
Private equity portfolio companies
Companies formerly listed on the London Stock Exchange
Government-owned companies of the United Kingdom
1964 establishments in England
Bingley